Saint-Pierre-sur-Dives (literally Saint-Pierre on Dives) is a former commune in the Calvados department in the Normandy region in northwestern France. On 1 January 2017, it was merged into the new commune Saint-Pierre-en-Auge.

The abbey church was rebuilt during the 12th and 13th centuries and restored and modified in the 16th and 17th centuries, replacing the former abbey church built in 1011 by William the Conqueror's aunt, Countess Lesceline. The church was entirely restored in the 16th century. By that time it got its general current appearance: a long main nave with two aisles and five radiating chapels, in the Gothic style.

11th-century market hall

The market hall is an example of Norman medieval architecture and dates from the 11th century. It was originally used by the Benedictine monks of the abbey to sell their goods to the locals. The structure was listed as a historical monument the 6 March 1889. The hall was completely destroyed by fire during the German withdrawal from the area in the summer of 1944. The halls were rebuilt using chestnut wood (same as the original).

Events

Weekly open-air market every Monday morning in the square which surrounds the 11th-century market hall. Cattle market every Monday in the market square. About a hundred calves are sold to the breeders every week as well as sheep, pigs and some goats. There is also an antiques market the first Sunday of each month at the market hall. Opposite the main hall is La Cour des Brocanteurs - a small courtyard selling second hand items, antiques, design, vintage, jewellery and outdoor furniture.

Sights
The Protective Botanical Garden collects old varieties of flowers and vegetables.

International relations
The commune is twinned with the following towns.

Population

See also
Communes of the Calvados department

References

External links

 Official Website
 Abbey St. Pierre Website

Former communes of Calvados (department)
Calvados communes articles needing translation from French Wikipedia